Giovanni Spennazzi (1597–1658) was a Roman Catholic prelate who served as Bishop of Pienza (1637–1658).

Biography
Giovanni Spennazzi was born in 1597 in Siena, Italy.
On 5 October 1637, he was appointed during the papacy of Pope Urban VIII as Bishop of Pienza.
On 11 October 1637, he was consecrated bishop by Alessandro Bichi, Bishop of Carpentras, with Tommaso Carafa, Bishop Emeritus of Vulturara e Montecorvino, and Joseph-Marie de Suarès, Bishop of Vaison, serving as co-consecrators. 
He served as Bishop of Pienza until his death on 11 August 1658.

References

External links and additional sources
 (for Chronology of Bishops) 
 (for Chronology of Bishops) 

17th-century Italian Roman Catholic bishops
Bishops appointed by Pope Urban VIII
People from Siena
1597 births
1658 deaths
Bishops of Pienza